The Piota is an Apennine torrent in the Province of Alessandria, north-west Italy.

Geography

The Piota passes through the territory of the communes of  Bosio, Casaleggio Boiro, Lerma, Tagliolo Monferrato, Silvano d'Orba and Rocca Grimalda. As a tributary of the Orba, the Piota falls within the Po basin.

The river's source is on the Piedmontese flank of Monte Pracaban and its course takes it through the wild landscapes of the Ligurian Apennine that form the Parco Regionale delle Capanne di Marcarolo. Having been joined by the Gorzente, the Piota enters the Orba near Silvano d'Orba.

Fishing 
Trout are fished for in the river and it is possible to pan flecks of gold.

References 

Rivers of Italy
Rivers of the Province of Alessandria